Hoseynabad (also Romanized as Ḩoseynābād; also known as Hosein Abad Abarghoo, Ḩoseynābād-e Abrqū, and Husainābād) is a village in Mehrabad Rural District, Bahman District, Abarkuh County, Yazd Province, Iran. At the 2006 census, its population was 289, in 83 families.

References 

Populated places in Abarkuh County